Golabad (also Romanized as Golābād) is a village in Chahdegal Rural District, Negin Kavir District, Fahraj County, Kerman Province, Iran. At the 2006 census, its population was 187, in 46 families.

References 

Populated places in Fahraj County